Alfie Hewett and Gordon Reid defeated the defending champion Joachim Gérard and his partner Tom Egberink in the final, 7–5, 6–2 to win the gentlemen's doubles wheelchair tennis title at the 2021 Wimbledon Championships. It was their fourth Wimbledon title as a team. With the win, they became the first men's wheelchair players to complete a non-calendar-year Grand Slam, and it was their third step towards a Grand Slam.

Gérard and Stefan Olsson were the reigning champions, but Olsson did not qualify for Wimbledon.

Seeds

Draw

Finals

References

Sources
WC Men's Doubles

Men's Wheelchair Doubles
Wimbledon Championship by year – Wheelchair men's doubles